Arastu (also Romanized as Arasţū; also known as Estūr and Ostūr) is a village in Bibi Sakineh Rural District, in the Central District of Malard County, Tehran Province, Iran. At the 2006 census, its population was 971, in 249 families.

References 

Populated places in Malard County